Shanghai Community International School (SCIS) is a non-profit educational day school, governed by a self-perpetuating board of directors and overseen by the International Schools Foundation. SCIS has three campuses spread across Shanghai, including locations in Puxi and Pudong.

SCIS is accredited through the Western Association of Schools and Colleges (WASC) and authorized as an International Baccalaureate (IB) Continuum World School. Additionally, SCIS is a member of the East Asia Regional Council of Overseas Schools (EARCOS) and the Association of China and Mongolia International Schools (ACAMIS).

Shanghai Community International School is a sister school to Hangzhou International School (HIS).

History
Shanghai Community International School was founded in 1996 for the children of expatriates residing in Shanghai, China. SCIS is a member of the East Asian Regional Conference of Overseas Schools and in 2001 received full accreditation with the Western Association of Schools and Colleges (WASC). SCIS received a six-year term of accreditation by the National Council of Curriculum and Textbooks, becoming the first international school in Shanghai to achieve this distinction.

The school is operated under the aegis of the International School Foundation (ISF). ISF is a not-for-profit organization in Lansing, Michigan, USA, and accorded 501c3 status by the U.S. Internal Revenue Service. The foundation helped to establish the North Jakarta International School (1990), the Shanghai Community International School (1996), Hangzhou International School (2002), the International School of Perth (1999) and the American International School of Cape Town (2001).

All of these schools are accredited by the Western Association of Schools and Colleges (WASC).  Each school is legally established according to its respective country’s prevailing regulations for educational institutions, and each offers a U.S.-based international school program for expatriate residents (and local nationals where permitted), who seek an international education.

Campuses and facilities
Shanghai Community International School operates on three campuses in Shanghai:

 SCIS-Hongqiao ECE Campus (Nursery-Kindergarten): 2212 Hongqiao Road, Changning, Puxi, Shanghai, China 200336
 SCIS-Hongqiao Main Campus(Grades 1-12): 1161 Hongqiao Road, Changning, Puxi, Shanghai, China 200051
 SCIS-Pudong Campus (Nursery-12): 198 Hengqiao Road, Zhoupu, Pudong, Shanghai, China 201315

SCIS has over 1700 students coming from more than 60 countries. Thirty-five percent of students are from North America, 30% of students are from Europe, and 30% of students are from Asia, with the remaining 5% coming from Africa, Australia, and South America.

SCIS has 210 teachers who are fully licensed in their area of teaching. They come from the USA, Canada, England, New Zealand, Australia, and South Africa. The school aims to keep its classroom size small to maximize personal attention.

SCIS draws from the North American system (grade levels, similar structure of class offerings, daily schedule, yearly calendar), with school hours for student attendance set from 8:00 to 3:00, Mondays through Fridays.

Curriculum

Shanghai Community International School (SCIS) is an International Baccalaureate (IB) Continuum World School. This accreditation extends across all SCIS Campuses, including Hongqiao and Pudong, providing a seamless program for students aged 2–18, covering the Primary Years Programme (PYP), Middle Years Programme (MYP), and Diploma Programme (DP).

Extracurricular activities
Students participate in a series of sporting events held under the jurisdiction of China International Schools Sports Association (CISSA). A typical CISSA schedule of athletic events includes tournaments in volleyball, soccer and basketball, and includes some invitational events, such as cross-country, badminton and swimming. High school students participate at the Junior Varsity (JV) level (D2) or at the Varsity level (D1). SCIS is also part of Association of China and Mongolia International Schools (ACAMIS) and China International Schools Sports Association (CISSA).

Additionally, SCIS offers after-school activities (ASAs), including Cheer-leading, Student Council, Model United Nations, Drama, Musicals, Dance Club, Jazz Band, Choir, Reading Clubs, Creative Writing, After-School Bands, Electronics Club, National Honor Society, National Junior Honor Society, Interact Club, and Global Issues Network.

Press
 SCIS recognized for their high-quality Early Childhood Education programs.
 Little Star Magazine Shanghai reported that SCIS experienced a “record amount of enrollment growth.” 
 Little Star Magazine Shanghai recognized SCIS for their dedicated efforts to become a “green school.”
 SCIS recognized for their community service projects.
 Little Star Magazine Shanghai highlights unique Upper School China Trip experience.
 SCIS is recognized by Good Schools Guide International as one of the top schools in Shanghai.
 Shanghai City Weekend voted SCIS as one of the top 3 schools in Shanghai that build character in their students.
 Shanghai Family lists SCIS as one out of only three schools in Shanghai that offer a certified and viable US-based curriculum.
 China Service Mail lists SCIS as one of the best international schools in Shanghai.
 SCIS is listed on Chalksmart.com, the recognized guide to international schools in Shanghai

See also
 List of international schools in the People's Republic of China
 List of international schools in Shanghai

References

External links

 Shanghai Community International School

International schools in Shanghai
International Baccalaureate schools in China
Private schools in China
Private schools in Shanghai